PEB Steel Buildings is a Vietnamese-based steel manufacturing and construction company that specializes in the design, making and building of pre-engineered steel buildings.

The company's customers include Nike, an Adidas shoes manufacturer, Canon, Unilever, Samsung, Doosan, Aeon, Anheuser-Busch Inbev Brewery, Heineken, LG Electronics, Sapporo and Obayashi.

Projects 

PEB Steel Buildings has completed 6,000 buildings with varying functional purposes, including factories, warehouses and distribution centers, steel and paper mills, petrochemical plants, power stations, shipyards, spectator venues, sports centers, and multi-storey buildings.

The firm services a regional demand for the construction of steel buildings in Vietnam, Thailand, Cambodia, Malaysia, Bangladesh, India, Sri Lanka, Indonesia, Myanmar, Philippines, and Pakistan. PEB Steel has also recently sold and constructed large projects to Qatar and Saudi Arabia.

Other products 

PEB Steel Buildings has developed, marketed, and installed other building-related products.

Pebsteel's Factories 

PEB Steel Buildings has seven factories in Asia. Six are located in Ba Ria-Vung Tau, Vietnam. PEB Steel has a joint venture with PEB Steel Lloyd factory in Pithampur, India with an area of 90,000 sqm.

PEB Steel Buildings fabricates steel structures at its own plant in Ba Ria-Vung Tau Province, Vietnam.

PEB Steel Buildings' fifth factory opened in 2009 and is located in Dong Xuyen Industrial Park, Ba Ria-Vung Tau Province. The plant increased production capacity in Vietnam by 18,000 MT, with total Asian capacity recorded at 120,000 MT annually.

References 

Steel companies of Vietnam
Construction and civil engineering companies of Vietnam
Manufacturing companies based in Ho Chi Minh City
Manufacturing companies established in 1994
Vietnamese brands
Vietnamese companies established in 1994
Construction and civil engineering companies established in 1994